Giovanni Battista Nepita (1624 – 12 July 1701) was a Roman Catholic prelate who served as Bishop of Massa Lubrense (1685–1701) and Bishop of Sant'Angelo dei Lombardi e Bisaccia (1680–1685).

Biography
Giovanni Battista Nepita was born in Vastro Villari, Italy, in 1624 and ordained a priest on 20 March 1649.
On 8 January 1680, he was appointed during the papacy of Pope Innocent XI as Bishop of Sant'Angelo dei Lombardi e Bisaccia. 
On 14 January 1680, he was consecrated bishop by Alessandro Crescenzi (cardinal), Bishop of Recanati e Loreto, with Domenico Gianuzzi, Titular Bishop of Dioclea in Phrygia, and Pier Antonio Capobianco, Bishop Emeritus of Lacedonia, serving as co-consecrators. 
On 26 March 1685, he was appointed during the papacy of Pope Gregory XIII as Bishop of Massa Lubrense. 
He served as Bishop of Massa Lubrense until his death on 12 July 1701.

References

External links and additional sources
 (for Chronology of Bishops) 
 (for Chronology of Bishops) 
 (for Chronology of Bishops) 
 (for Chronology of Bishops) 

17th-century Italian Roman Catholic bishops
Bishops appointed by Pope Innocent XI
1624 births
1701 deaths
Archbishops of Sant'Angelo dei Lombardi-Conza-Nusco-Bisaccia